Michael Johnson (4 October 1933 – 19 July 2004) was an English professional association football player and manager.

Over the course of his playing career, Johnson turned out for Newcastle United, Blyth Spartans, Brighton and Hove Albion, Gloucester City, Fulham FC, Doncaster Rovers and Barrow all in England before moving to Australia and playing with South Coast United, Metropolitan Adriatic and Sutherland Sharks.

Johnson then turned his hand to management moving to the front office of the Sutherland Sharks before going on to manage St George Saints, Blacktown City Demons, Fairy Meadow before finishing his managerial career by claiming the treble of NSW Premier League Premiership, Championship and the NSW Waratah Cup in 1992 with the Bonnyrigg White Eagles.

Johnson died on 19 July 2004 in Wollongong after a long battle with illness.

External links
 Oz Football profile

References

1933 births
Footballers from York
2004 deaths
English footballers
Association football wingers
Gloucester City A.F.C. players
Bonnyrigg White Eagles FC managers
South Coast United players
Newcastle United F.C. players
Blyth Spartans A.F.C. players
Brighton & Hove Albion F.C. players
Fulham F.C. players
Doncaster Rovers F.C. players
Barrow A.F.C. players
English expatriate footballers
Expatriate soccer players in Australia
English football managers
English expatriate football managers
Expatriate soccer managers in Australia